Metodi Kostov (Bulgarian: Методи Костов; born 4 April 1990) is a Bulgarian footballer who plays as a forward.

Career

Vereya
Kostov joined Vereya in the beginning of 2016. He made his First League debut on 30 July 2016 in a match against Dunav Ruse.  He left the club in January 2017.

Litex
In January 2017, Kostov signed with Litex Lovech.  His contract was terminated by mutual consent at the end of the 2017–18 season.

Botev Galabovo
On 12 July 2018, Kostov signed with Botev Galabovo.

References

External links
 
 

1990 births
Living people
Sportspeople from Blagoevgrad
Bulgarian footballers
OFC Pirin Blagoevgrad players
PFC Minyor Pernik players
FC Septemvri Simitli players
FC Vereya players
PFC Litex Lovech players
FC Botev Galabovo players
OFC Vihren Sandanski players
First Professional Football League (Bulgaria) players
Second Professional Football League (Bulgaria) players
Association football forwards